Permanent Residence is a 2009 Hong Kong film starring Sean Li and Osman Hung. It was directed by Hong Kong filmmaker Danny Cheng, also known as Scud. The film explores several themes traditionally regarded as 'taboo' in Hong Kong society, in an unusually open, convention-defying way, and features full-frontal male nudity in several scenes. It is the second of seven publicly released films by Scud. The six other films are: City Without Baseball in 2008, Amphetamine in 2010, Love Actually... Sucks! in 2011, Voyage in 2013, Utopians in 2015 and Thirty Years of Adonis in 2017. The eighth film, Apostles, was made in 2022, as was the ninth, Bodyshop, but neither has yet been released. The tenth and final film, Naked Nations: Hong Kong Tribe, is currently in production.

Plot
The film explores the near true-life story of a young Chinese man (said to be a semi-autobiography of the film's writer/producer), who seeks a long-term relationship with a straight friend. The friend is aware of his inclination, and is happy to befriend him, but is very reluctant to express open affection for him or to become emotionally involved.

Production
Permanent Residence examines the limit of life, and is the first of a trilogy: the second, called Amphetamine, examines the limits of passion, while the third, known as Life of an Artist, examines the limits of art. Amphetamine was screened at the Berlin International Film Festival on 15 February 2010, and was also shown at the Hong Kong International Film Festival on 6 April 2010. The third film, Life of an Artist, has not yet been released.

In the album book that accompanies the film, the director, Scud appears naked as he replaces Sean Li in the photos in an attempt to emphasize the semi-autobiographical nature of the film. Publicity videos accompanying the film also feature the full-frontal nudity of famous Hong Kong model Byron Pang, who was a contestant in the Mr. Hong Kong 2005 contest, and the film's director ('Scud'), himself. The film was said by critics to be both insightful and mournful as it reflects on the fleeting nature of love and mortality.

Cast
 Osman Hung as Windson
 Sean Li as Ivan
 Jackie Chow Tak Bong as Josh Aviv
 Lau Yu Hong as Nam
 Eva Lo as Eva

DVD & Blu-ray
A Panorama Distribution (HK) edition of this film was released internationally on DVD on 5 October 2009 and on Blu-ray Disc on 4 August 2011. A US Blu-ray edition was released on 3 May 2011.

See also
 Hong Kong films of 2009
 List of lesbian, gay, bisexual or transgender-related films

References

External links

Chinese Movie Database - English version
Love HK Film entry
Permanent Residence at the Hong Kong Cinemagic
Permanent Residence at the Hong Kong Movie Database

2009 films
Films directed by Scud (filmmaker)
Films set in Hong Kong
Gay-related films
Hong Kong independent films
LGBT-related drama films
Hong Kong LGBT-related films
2009 drama films
English-language Hong Kong films
2000s Cantonese-language films
Male bisexuality in film
2009 directorial debut films
2009 LGBT-related films
2000s Hong Kong films